Araneus alsine, the strawberry spider or orange wheelweaving spider, is a species of the orb-weaving spider family, Araneidae.

Distribution
This species has a palearctic distribution (Europe, Turkey, Caucasus, Russia, Kazakhstan, Japan).

Habitat
These spiders prefer moist environments. They mainly inhabit forests clearings, swampy bogs with birch and heather, wet meadows, high grass and shady places.

Description

These spiders have a large, almost globular or slightly elliptical shaped opisthosoma, ranging from beige to reddish-orange, with many white-and-yellow spots spread over the surface and sometimes forming the sign of a cross. Sternum, chelicerae and legs are reddish brown. Legs show  darker annulations in males. As one of its common names suggests, A. alsine  appears somewhat like a strawberry.

Habits
In June and July A. alsine builds small webs (less than 10 or 20 cm high) near the ground and waits near them in dried leaves that it has rolled together, forming an inverted cone. The retreat and web can be found in low vegetation, often near bushes of Vaccinium uliginosum. Mating occurs in June and July, eggs are laid until August. The spiderlings soon hatch, overwinter in a subadult stadium and are full-grown in early summer next year.

Bibliography
Blackwall, J., 1864a - A history of the spiders of Great Britain and Ireland. London, Ray Society, vol.2, pp. 175–384. 
Bösenberg, W., 1901 - Die Spinnen Deutschlands. I. Zoologica (Stuttgart) vol.14(1), pp. 1–96.
Heiko Bellmann, Guida ai ragni d'Europa, Roma, Franco Muzzio Editore, 2011, pp. 138–139, .
Heimer, S. & W. Nentwig, 1991 - Spinnen Mitteleuropas: Ein Bestimmungsbuch. Verlag Paul Parey, Berlin, 543 pp.
Locket, G.H. & A.F. Millidge, 1953 - British spiders. Ray Society, London, vol.2, pp. 1–449.
Sestáková, A., M. Krumpál & Z. Krumpálová, 2009 - Araneidae (Araneae) Strednej Európy: I. Rod Araneus. Bratislava, Prírodovedecká Fakulta Univerzity Komenskéhó, 151 pp.
Simon, E., 1929 - Les arachnides de France. Synopsis générale et catalogue des espèces françaises de l'ordre des Araneae; 3e partie. Paris, vol.6, pp. 533–772. 
Walckenaer, C.A., 1802 - Faune parisienne. Insectes. ou Histoire abrégée des insectes de environs de Paris. Paris vol.2, pp. 187–250.

References

External links
 Norman I. Platnick, 2006. The World Spider Catalog, Version 7.0. American Museum of Natural History.

alsine
Spiders described in 1802
Palearctic spiders